Aastejärv (or Aastajärv) is a lake in Estonia.

See also
List of lakes in Estonia

Lakes of Estonia
Saaremaa Parish
Landforms of Saare County